There were seven rowing events at the 2014 South American Games: two women's events and five men's events.

Medal summary

Medal table

Medalists

References

2014 South American Games events
South American Games
2014